Sueños is Yolandita Monge's thirteenth (13th) studio album and third with CBS Records (now Sony Music Latin). It includes the hits "Sola", "Siempre Tú", "La Distancia", "Acéptame como Soy", "El Amor", and the title track.  This album marked a change for a more contemporary pop sound for the singer, along with a change of image.

This release marked an important transition in the career of Yolandita Monge. So far all her records had maintained a similar musical concept and arrangements.  However, with this production the singer launched a new, fresh and modern international pop sound that served as the preamble to the "boom" that broke out with her next album, Luz de Luna. This production also marked her foray into dance pop and the first of several radical image make-overs that would place her at the forefront of fashion trends in Puerto Rico.

The album was re-issued on CD format in 1993 and is currently out of print in all media formats. Several hits songs appear in various compilations of the singer available as digital downloads at iTunes and Amazon.

Track listing

Credits and personnel

Vocals: Yolandita Monge
Producers: Oscar Gómez, Mariano Pérez
Arrangements: Javier Lozada, Graham Presket
Drums: Bret Morgan
Bass: Paul Jones
Guitars: Chris Rea, Ray Russell, Nigel Jenkins, Rodrigo
Piano: Javier Lozada, Graham Presket
Percussion: Henry Díaz
P.P.G.: Javier Lozada
Prophet 10: Javier Lozada, Graham Presket
Prophet One: Javier Lozada
Rolland: Mariano Pérez
Engineers: Gary Shutton, Luis Galleja
Chorus: María Ovelar, Sol Tate, José Falcón, Javier Lozada, Marianelli
Wardrobe: Coral Boutique
Makeup: Raymond Medina
Photography: Al Freddy

Notes
Track listing and credits from album cover.
Released in Cassette Format on 1983 (DIC-10345).
Released in CD Format (Serie De Oro) on 1993 (CDB-81002/2-469573).

References

Yolandita Monge albums
1983 albums